Brigitte Berendonk (born 2 May 1942) is a German athlete. She competed in the women's discus throw at the 1968 Summer Olympics and the 1972 Summer Olympics.

Publications

References

1942 births
Living people
People from Wartburgkreis
German female discus throwers
Sportspeople from Thuringia
Olympic athletes of West Germany
Athletes (track and field) at the 1968 Summer Olympics
Athletes (track and field) at the 1972 Summer Olympics
Recipients of the Cross of the Order of Merit of the Federal Republic of Germany
Universiade silver medalists for West Germany
Universiade bronze medalists for West Germany
Universiade medalists in athletics (track and field)
Medalists at the 1967 Summer Universiade
Medalists at the 1970 Summer Universiade